Garrison  is a small village near Lough Melvin in County Fermanagh, Northern Ireland. The Roogagh River runs through the village. In the 2001 Census it had a population of 357 people. It is situated within Fermanagh and Omagh district.

According to the UK Met Office, the highest temperature ever recorded in Northern Ireland is 30.8 °C (87.4 °F) at Knockarevan, Garrison on 30 June 1976.

Toponymy
The village's name comes from a military barracks and its garrison of troops established in the village by William III of England, following the Battle of Aughrim in 1691.

History
Garrison was one of several Catholic border villages in Fermanagh that would have been transferred to the Irish Free State had the recommendations of the Irish Boundary Commission been enacted in 1925.

The Melvin Hotel, previously owned by the McGovern family, was blown up in January 1972 during the middle of a Catholic wedding reception, by the IRA, reportedly as retaliation for allowing members of the security forces to stay on the premises.

The Police Service of Northern Ireland came under gun attack in the town on 21 November 2009.

Tourism

Visitors to Garrison can enjoy a wide range of activities including golfing, fishing, hill-walking, water sports, horse-riding, cycling, camping and caving. The Lough Melvin Holiday Centre caters for large groups and there are many local guesthouses and chalets to let. Two local pubs – The Melvin Bar and The Riverside Bar – provide music and craic. The local restaurant, The Bilberry, is well known in the North-West region.

Transport
Ulsterbus route 64 serves Garrison on Thursday with two journeys to Belleek and Belcoo and one journey to Letterbreen and Enniskillen. Belleek, approximately five miles away, is served by Bus Éireann route 30 every two hours each way for most of the day plus an overnight coach. This route operates to Donegal, Cavan, Dublin Airport and Dublin.

Lough Melvin

Lough Melvin in Ireland is home to the Gillaroo or 'salmo stomachius', a species of trout which eats primarily snails. Gillaroo is derived from the Irish for 'red fellow' (Giolla Rua). This is due to the fish's distinctive colouring. It has a bright buttery golden colour on its flanks with bright crimson and vermillion spots. The gillaroo is also characterised by a "gizzard", which is used to aid the digestion of hard food items such as water snails. They feed almost exclusively on bottom-living animals (snails, sedge fly larvae and freshwater shrimp), except in late summer when they come to the surface to feed and may be caught on the dry fly. Other lakes reputed to contain the gillaroo are Lough Neagh, Lough Conn, Lough Mask and Lough Corrib. However, the unique gene found in the Lough Melvin trout has not been found in some 200 trout populations in Ireland or Britain and experiments carried out by Queen's University Belfast established that the Lough Melvin gillaroo species has not been found anywhere else in the world.

The sonaghan trout (Salmo nigripinnis) is a sub-species of trout unique to Lough Melvin. It can have a light brown or silvery hue with large, distinctive black spots. There are sometimes small, inconspicuous red spots located along its posterior region. Its fins are dark brown or black with elongated pectorals. Sonaghan are found in areas of open, deep water, where they feed on mid-water planktonic organisms.

Notable residents
 Mick Moohan, one time cabinet minister in the New Zealand Government and Patrick Treacy, author and one time physician to Michael Jackson, were both born in Garrison.

See also
 List of townlands in County Fermanagh
 List of towns and villages in Northern Ireland
 B52 road (Northern Ireland)

References

 Culture Northern Ireland

Villages in County Fermanagh
Townlands of County Fermanagh
Fermanagh and Omagh district